Daniel Michael Paul Cudmore (1811 – 3 November 1891) was a pastoralist in the early days of South Australia and the founder of a family highly influential in that and other States, especially Queensland.

History
Daniel was born in Tory Hall in County Limerick, Ireland in 1811 and educated in Essex, England. In 1835 he and his wife Mary (née Nihill), together with his wife's immediate family, emigrated to Australia on the John Denniston under Captain Mackie which left Liverpool on 11 February 1835 for Sydney, Australia and arrived in Hobart, Tasmania (or Van Diemen's Land as it was then known) on 7 June 1835. His original destination may have been Sydney, but while the ship was in Hobart, he met a cousin, surgeon Captain Russell of the 63rd Regiment, who persuaded him to settle in Tasmania. Daniel found employment as a schoolmaster, then at Peter DeGraves' (1878 – 31 December 1852) Cascade Brewery at The Cascades in Hobart.

A year later they received news of the Proclamation of South Australia and he chartered a yacht and with a cargo of supplies headed for the new colony, arriving at Holdfast Bay early in 1837, Mary following in the Siren, on which yacht their second child, James Francis, was born. Daniel was a partner in the Adelaide Union Brewing Company opposite the office of the Southern Australian on Rundle Street in 1838. In August 1843 he took out a wine and beer licence for the "Harp Inn" (later "Harp of Tara") on North East Road, near Dry Creek. In the early 1840s he built a substantial brewery and a malt factory off Melbourne Street, North Adelaide, which perhaps became the Lion Brewing and Malting Company.

In 1847 the news came that he had inherited a considerable property, "Manister", in County Limerick, Ireland from Jane Cudmore (c. 1803 – 7 May 1847), a cousin. He arranged for it to be sold and with the proceeds purchased pastoral properties in the mid-north of South Australia: Yongala, Pinda and Beautiful Valley (situated between Mount Remarkable and Port Augusta Stations). He also purchased the Paringa cattle station. He left management of these properties to his sons and went to Queensland. He took up a station on the Clarke River, a tributary of the Burdekin River, and purchased 4,000 acres on the Herbert River, near Cardwell for a sugar plantation. In 1871 he purchased Avoca Station at the junction of the Murray and Darling Rivers in New South Wales and in 1876 added the adjoining Popiltah Station, making a total leasehold of 900,000 acres and freehold of 33,000 acres near Wentworth.

His sons Daniel Henry, Milo Robert and Arthur Frederick together ran Avoca and Popiltah stations in New South Wales, Oakvale in South Australia, and Boondoon in Queensland as Cudmore Brothers. In 1895 Daniel Henry left the partnership to take over Boondoon.

Interests
Daniel was a strong swimmer, and saved several people from drowning.

He wrote several poems, published under the title Poetical Scraps.

In 1862 he bought "Hartley Bank", near Glen Osmond, built-in 1848 by Alfred Hardy, one of Colonel Light's survey team. He renamed it "Claremont" and immediately set about enlarging it.

Family

Daniel Michael Paul Cudmore (1811 – 3 November 1891) married Mary Nihill (c. 1811 – 6 March 1893) in 1835, home "Claremont", Glen Osmond, South Australia. Among their children were:

Dymphna Maria
eldest daughter Dymphna Maria (22 July 1836 – 4 March 1899) married Sidney Yeates (30 August 1831 – 20 June 1918) on 27 March 1857, lived at Baroota, South Australia, Boondoon Station, in the Warrego district, Queensland and Maurbry, Toowoomba.
Sidney James Yeates (4 March 1858 – 5 June 1899)
Florence Barr "Flora" Yeates (10 June 1859 – 5 January 1910)
Albert Yeates (9 November 1860 – 10 October 1941) married Helen Anne Blackett (1857 – 26 June 1931) on 13 February 1889 Helen was a sister of Mrs. Walter Yeates.
Edwin Percy Yeates (2 July 1862 – 1946)
Mary Dymphna Yeates (11 March 1865 – 24 February 1901) married Ernest Francis DeChair (1865 – c. 1906) on 18 February 1893
Daniel Henry Cashell "Harry" Yeates (16 April 1867 – 20 August 1954)
Walter Cudmore Yeates (6 March 1869 – 23 April 1952) married Clara Elizabeth "Lily" Blackett ( – 9 October 1952) on 27 April 1895. Clara was a sister of Mrs. Albert Yeates.
(Charles) Bryson Yeates (8 January 1871 – 29 July 1924) married Emma Hughes on 17 December 1919
Alfred Milo Yeates (14 December 1872 – 27 May 1919) partner, Yeates Brothers stock and station agents, Toowoomba
Gilbert De Lacy Yeates (22 November 1874 – 27 September 1945) married Mildred Grace Wickham (17 December 1876 – 28 February 1976) on 11 August 1903  
Kenneth Barr Yeates (23 September 1876 – 11 July 1939) married (Catherine) Jessie Klose (6 April 1880 – 3 February 1955) on 26 September 1908. Kenneth was a partner, Yeates Brothers
Herbert Yeates M.L.C. (31 January 1879 – 24 December 1945) born in Bowen, Queensland, married Margaret Ann McNeil Tolmie (20 September 1878 – 1 June 1973) on 11 April 1906. Their home was "Rose-bank", Toowoomba. He was a partner in Yeates Brothers and a member of the Queensland Legislative Council from 1938 to 1945. Margaret was a sister of James Tolmie MLA.

James Francis
J(ames) F(rancis) (11 October 1837 – 17 August 1912) had property at Paringa, South Australia and, in partnership with Albert Yeates, Boondoo station. He married Margaret Budge (22 October 1845 – 1 December 1912) on 26 March 1867, home "Paringa Hall", Brighton, South Australia was sold in 1914 to the Marist Brothers, and is now the centrepiece of Sacred Heart College.
James Kenneth (29 December 1867 – 28 April 1948) of Tara station, Queensland. In 1922 he purchased 10,000 acres of Mooki Springs, Quirindi, New South Wales named it "Claremont", then retired to Mosman, New South Wales. He married Alice Eliza May ( – 3 October 1949) on 28 March 1894. Their children were Amy, Jim, Milo and Hurtle.

Sir Arthur Murray Cudmore FRCS (11 June 1870 – 27 February 1951) married Kathleen Mary Cavenagh-Mainwaring (11 February 1874 – 8 March 1951) on 13 August 1901. Sir Arthur was a leading surgeon and University of Adelaide academic.
Rosemary (7 May 1904 – 24 October 1987) married Rafe Gordon Dutton Cavenagh-Mainwaring, of Whitmore Hall, Whitmore, Staffordshire on 11 June 1931
Kathleen (27 June 1908 – 11 June 2013) married (Richard) Geoffrey Champion de Crespigny (16 June 1907 – 12 February 1966) on 10 June 1933. A widow, she married again, to Maj-Gen. George William Symes (12 January 1896 – 26 August 1980) on 30 March 1967.
Violet Mary (7 February 1872 – 3 June 1947) married Walter Frederick Andrews (c. 1866 – 24 June 1938) on 29 August 1894, lived at "Paringa", Narrogin, Western Australia.
Kenneth de Lacy Cudmore (26 February 1874 – 17 February 1940) married Kathleen Throsby (died c. 25 December 1951) on 22 April 1899. Father of Ken and Keith. He was Sydney manager of Goldsbrough Mort and Co.
Dorothea Nevill Cudmore (7 June 1876 – 9 February 1925) married Leo Morphett Henderson (20 June 1874 – ), of "Cooarra" Hines Hill, Western Australia on 28 January 1914. Henderson was in the same mounted contingent as Harry Harbord "Breaker" Morant.
(Thomas) Cecil (31 October 1877 – 7 February 1927) married Olive Eva Cochrane (died 21 April 1946) on 3 October 1907. They had no children; he died after an operation; she married again, to John Hamilton Forrest (c. 1858 – 18 February 1938) of Collaroy, New South Wales, on 25 May 1933. 
Rosa Florence (30 September 1879 – 23 July 1954) married Reginald "Joe" Bickford (26 January 1880 – 20 November 1948) on 10 November 1910. Reginald was a son of William Bickford.

Daniel Cashiel "Dan" (10 February 1881 – 1966) married Kathleen Esmé  Pile (11 April 1883 – ) on 8 December 1910. They divorced in 1930. He married again, to Dorrit Louise Yorke Pile (née Sparks) ( – 1970) on 3 May 1932. He was a keen horseman and partner with L. F. Aldridge, son of James Henry Aldridge, in Richmond Park Stud, which they quit in 1929 for Kismet Park, Sunbury, Victoria.
Alexandrina Budge Cudmore (15 June 1882 – 27 November 1942) married Hugh John Crawford (2 May 1881 – 21 March 1943) on 26 June 1907. Hugh was a member of the Crawford and Son family of grocers.

Mary Paringa (12 February 1887 – 15 October 1952) married Arthur Mortlock Tresillion Toll (24 March 1884 – 1964) on 28 June 1911. A. M. Toll was a champion golfer and horseman.
Robert Milo (13 February 1889 – 14 January 1969) married Jane "Jeannie" Fulton (2 September 1886 – 5 October 1915), daughter of George E. Fulton on 27 September 1915. Home "Ivanhoe Downs", Morven, Queensland. R. M. Cudmore was the owner of Paringa Building, 13 Hindley Street built in 1925.
Robert Milo (9 March 1923 – 7 January 1997)
Mary Jane (26 September 1839 – 3 July 1909) moved to Killiney, Ireland, never married.

Margaret Alice
Margaret Alice (15 July 1842 – 9 December 1871) married George Agars J.P. (4 July 1837 – 2 December 1900) on 14 January 1863. home Courtabie station, Venus Bay, South Australia. Agars married again, to Margaret Dinnison ( – ) on 1 May 1878 and had at least two more children (Grace (died 15 November 1936) and James Magnus (died 7 January 1946)). George owned at various times Courtabie, Warna Grange and Avoca stations.
George Arthur Agars (23 May 1864 – 5 June 1943) married Annie Rosina Crowder ( – ) on 2 November 1891. Educated at AEI, he worked for his uncle Dan Cudmore on Avoca and Popiltah stations, was an irrigation pioneer of Mildura around 1895, then moved to Renmark in 1907.
Frederick William "Fred" Agars (18 August 1866 – 2 August 1896) married Lucy Shipard (1865–) on 28 July 1890. He drowned after falling from the River Murray Steamer Invincible.
Rose Edith Agars (7 October 1868 – 1943) married (1) John Garrett Fitzsimmons (c. 1856 – 23 August 1906) on 26 March 1895 (2) William Buchanan ( – ) in 1908.
Eileen (6 January 1896 – c. 1950) married (1) cousin Ernest Osmond Cudmore (2 July 1894 – 26 September 1924) on 23 December 1922 (see below). (2) Senior constable H. T. "Tom" Coffey ( – ) in 1927. Both were noted equestrians. Fitzsimmons was for many years overseer of Popiltah station, then hotel manager. He died near Maldon, Victoria, after falling from his cart.
(Margaret) Alice Agars (22 October 1870 – 1901) married Charles Albert Prince (4 August 1865 – ) on 26 March 1894

Daniel Henry
Daniel Henry Cashell "Dan" Cudmore (7 February 1844 – 14 December 1913) married (1) Harriet Garrett Smedley (1845 – 16 March 1879) on 20 February 1872 (2) Martha Earle "Mattie" McCracken (1855 – 15 July 1938) on 15 November 1882, With brothers Milo Robert and Arthur Frederick ran Avoca and Popiltah stations then left in 1895 to manage Boondoon. His homes were "Thornbank", Northcote, Victoria and Avoca, New South Wales. He purchased "Adare", Victor Harbor, across the River Hindmarsh from Mount Breckan, from John Hindmarsh jun. Dan's widow lived at Palmer Place, North Adelaide in 1926. Their children included:
Henry Carrington Cudmore (6 December 1872 – 1 January 1950) emigrated to New Zealand. He fought in the Boer War with the 8th Contingent, embarking on the Cornwall on 8 February 1902. He married Maude Mary Munro (1893 – 17 March 1965) in 1914. They had no children. He died at Timaru, New Zealand
Mary Avoca Kilroy "Minnie" Cudmore (11 Jun 1874 – c. June 1959) married J(ames) Milroy Smith ( – 12 July 1942) on 24 May 1906. He was a pioneer of Mildura's dried fruit industry, later of "Ava", Spreyton, Tasmania in 1906.

Roland Herbert Cudmore (26 February 1879 – 22 October 1913) was an orchardist at Mildura, Victoria. He served in the Boer War in South Africa as a captain in the South Australian Imperial Bushmen Corps, and was captain of the Mildura golf club.  He was killed in a car crash at Neds Corner Station, near Kulnine and Morgan, South Australia. He married Annie Isabella Porter (26 June 1880 – 11 December 1939) on 26 September 1907. Among their children were:
Daniel Murray "Dan" Cudmore (6 July 1908 – 8 June 1948) purchased "Kingsford" near Gawler in 1943, where he grazed sheep. Competitor Round Australia car trial 1936. He married Marjorie Carroll, daughter of Lou Carroll in 1932? still fiancé in 1933 http://nla.gov.au/nla.news-article74006786 
Colleen Mary Cudmore (11 July 1912 – ) married (1) Geoffrey Bonython Angas-Parsons (son of Justice Angas Parsons and descendant of George Fife Angas) on 3 March 1934 (2) noted conductor and opera producer Stephan Beinl (1902–1970) in 1965
Margaret Earle Cudmore (8 August 1913 – 2004) married (Sir) Arthur Campbell Rymill (8 December 1907 – 27 March 1989) on 27 December 1934. They had two daughters, Rosemary and Annabel. Rymill Park in Adelaide was named in his honour.
Paul Russell (Thomas) Cudmore (11 August 1883 – 1969) married Ella Lucy Love (11 May 1883 – 1967) on 3 August 1910. He ran sheep on Adare station, home "Stranmore" on Flinders Parade , Victor Harbor Liberal candidate 1922, mayor of Victor Harbor in 1919, several years president of the Southern Agricultural Society and an active member of St. Augustine's (Anglican) Church. He was an excellent marksman and president of the Victor Harbor Rifle Club in 1929.
Peter McCracken Cudmore (11 September 1911 – 9 August 1995) married Nannette Deidre Whereat (1918–) on 30 December 1939. He joined the 2/3 Field Artillery and was captured in Crete and held in Germany as a POW.
Deidre (c. 1 November 1940 – ) was born while father a POW.
Milo Massey Cudmore (11 September 1916 – ) married (Phyllis) Mary Cragg (22 March 1922 – 14 October 1998) on 18 April 1945. Home in Apsley, Victoria, "Stranmore", Victor Harbor.
Sir Collier Robert Cudmore (14 June 1885 – 16 May 1971) solicitor, politician and Olympic rower. Married Phyllis Miriam Wigg (6 Sep 1892 – 2 June 1964) on 27 April 1922. Phyllis was a daughter of Dr. Alfred Edgar Wigg.
Milo Massey Cudmore MC (2 May 1888 – 27 March 1916) served with RFA in France during World War I, killed in action.

Sarah Elizabeth
Sarah Elizabeth "Rosa" (11 April 1846 – 12 June 1930) married Dr. John Sprod MRCS (9 January 1850 – 22 January 1921) on 15 July 1878. Sprod was appointed, then sacked, as City Health Officer, then appointed to the board of Adelaide Hospital, He was one of Australia's oldest practising physicians.
John Cudmore Sprod (24 April 1879 – possibly 1930) He enlisted in 1915 but was discharged a year later as permanently unfit for service, later reported as migrating to Canada, but his last known address was in Belgium.
Mary Ethel Sprod (27 September 1880 – 3 November 1953) married Stanley William Samuel Edwards (10 August 1893 – ) on 18 October 1922 Edwards served with the 3rd Infantry Brigade of the AIF at Gallipoli and France during World War I, also served during World War II.
Dr. Milo Weeks Sprod (6 May 1882 – 31 December 1934) married Dr. Lica Delprat (1882–), daughter of G. D. Delprat and sister of Lady Mawson on 11 April 1916, lived in Mannum His home "Kensingdale" occupied the block bounded by Magill Road, Kensington Terrace (later Portrush Road), Beulah Road and Verdun Street. He owned (as "M. Congresby") several racehorses.
John Delprat Sprod (4 January 1917 – ) never married
Milo James "Mick" Sprod (4 January 1917 – July 1995) never married
Henri Guillaume Sprod (13 June 1918 – 1993) married Betty Cazna Plummer (c. 1917 – 10 November 2010) on 10 January 1944, lived in Bondi, New South Wales

Madeleine (often Madeline) Elizabeth "Bobbie" Sprod (11 July 1920 – ), a prominent socialite, was engaged to John Willoughby in 1941, but married Flt Lt Ross Truscott (1910–) on 7 April 1945. Daughter Toni Jane Truscott married Richard Langley Burchnall, headmaster of St. Peter's College, Adelaide.
third son T(homas) Napier (4 February 1884 – 9 August 1942) married Isabelle Kathleen Knight (7 April 1888 – 10 April 1991) on 18 October 1916;
Kathleen Napier Sprod (7 January 1918 – 15 October 2017) married Sgt. (Colin) Deslandes Carter (29 May 1920 – ) on 7 January 1942
George Napier Sprod (16 September 1919 – 6 April 2003) Changi POW and celebrated cartoonist "Sprod"
John G(emmel) Sprod (10 February 1921 – 8 February 2007) was a photographer specialising in child studies. He married Megan Hunt of Kalangadoo in April 1952.
Thomas Daniel "Dan" Sprod (28 March 1924 – 17 November 2018) was librarian at the National Library of Australia then the Morris Miller Library of the University of Tasmania and author of numerous historical books. He founded Blubber Head Books and owned Astrolabe Bookshop in Hobart. He married Gleewyn Georgene Gummow on 10 June 1950 and had three sons: Timothy James (b 18 March 1951), Michael Napier (b 23 July 1952) and Daniel John (b 23 February 1955).
Agnes Cudmore Sprod (21 August 1886 – 1964) A keen sailor, she travelled to England on the Finnish barque Viking (Captain Ivar Hägerstrand) competing in the 1932 Grain race. She never returned to Australia, and never married.
Harold York Nevill Sprod (11 May 1891 – 1979) was a member of Stock Exchange. He married (Adeline) Doris Arnold ( – ) on 14 November 1923

Milo Robert
Milo Robert Cudmore (1852 – 12 July 1913) married Constance Alexander (c. 1855 – 22 January 1913) on 15 September 1891 home "Alverstoke" Glen Osmond, last address 17 Murphy Street South Yarra, Victoria
Francis Alexander "Frank" Cudmore (26 September 1892 – 24 July 1956) was a noted palaeontologist; he donated his extensive collection of Tertiary marine fossils to the National Museum of Australia. He married Evelyn Mary Eddy ( – 12 November 1936)
Ernest Osmond Cudmore (2 July 1894 – 26 September 1924) married cousin Eileen Fitzsimmons (6 January 1896 – 30 August 1982) on 23 December 1922 (see above).
Arthur Sexton Cudmore (14 April 1897 – 1974) married Beatrice Dorothy Carsons ( – 1986). Home 116 Riversdale Rd. Camberwell Vic. He was godson of Dr. Helen Sexton.
Wilfred Milo Cudmore (3 November 1899 – 16 July 1965) married Florence May Fulton ( – February 1977), lived in Victoria.
When the three surviving sons were orphaned, they were cared for by their mother's sister Dr. Lilian Helen Alexander (15 March 1861 – 18 October 1934) In 1935 A.S., F.A. and W.M. Cudmore presented a statue "The Wheel of Life" by Web Gilbert to the University of Melbourne in her memory. She and her friend (Hannah Mary) Helen Sexton (21 June 1862 – 12 October 1950) were two of the first three female medical graduates of the university.

Arthur Frederick
youngest son Arthur Frederick (17 December 1854 – 19 August 1919) ran Popiltah station, Avoca station, Wentworth, New South Wales with his brother Daniel Henry, retired in 1911 to "Mandeville Hall", Toorak, Victoria, died at Victoria Avenue, Medindie, South Australia. He married Anniettie Matilda "Nettie" Brooke (29 March 1856 – 10 July 1942) on 23 March 1881. They had home "Chilcote" in Bridgewater, South Australia.
(Sara) Kathleen de Lacy Cudmore (19 March 1883 – 1972) married Richard Frederick Roberts (c. 1854 – 31 March 1937) on 10 June 1909. home Baangal, Skipton, 50 km from Ballarat, Victoria.
Clara Francis Niall Cudmore (25 November 1884 – 5 March 1967) married Frederick Windmill Porter (23 February 1881 – 4 October 1937) on 1 June 1911; lived at Medindie, then Gilberton. Their son Robert Evelyn Porter (1913–1983) was Mayor of Adelaide from 1968 to 1971.
(Anniettie) Evelyn Pierpont (6 March 1889 – 1975) married George Stanley Stogdale (c. 1880 – 17 November 1945) on 21 March 1914, and moved to "Buckhurst", Double Bay, New South Wales where he managed the Sydney branch of Stogdale and Son. Their daughter Suzanne married H. D. Fairfax, son of Dr. E.W. Fairfax, in 1938.

Sources
Ritchie, Elsie For the Love of the Land: The history of the Cudmore family published by the author, Sydney, 2000. 
P. A. Howell, 'Cudmore, James Francis (1837–1912)', Australian Dictionary of Biography, National Centre of Biography, Australian National University, accessed 11 June 2013. (Shared entry with Daniel Henry Cudmore)
P. A. Howell, 'Cudmore, Sir Collier Robert (1885–1971)', Australian Dictionary of Biography, National Centre of Biography, Australian National University, accessed 11 June 2013.
Margaret Steven, 'Niall, James Mansfield (1860–1941)', Australian Dictionary of Biography, National Centre of Biography, Australian National University, accessed 11 June 2013.

References 

1811 births
1891 deaths
Australian pastoralists
South Australian families
Settlers of South Australia
Irish emigrants to colonial Australia
19th-century Australian businesspeople